Supply is a small unincorporated community in Brunswick County, North Carolina, United States, located around the intersection of US 17 (Ocean Highway) and NC 211 (Southport-Supply Road/Green Swamp Road). Its name is derived from the use of the Lockwoods Folly River as a trade route in the 18th and 19th centuries. Residents of the nearby beach communities of Holden Beach, Oak Island, Ocean Isle, Caswell Beach, and Sunset Beach often formerly commuted to Supply for goods and other materials. This practice is still common, but development in the town of Southport and in the Intracoastal Waterway commercial districts has made traveling to Supply unnecessary.

Geography
Supply is located midway between the town of Bolivia, the county seat of Brunswick County, and the city of Shallotte, and is just south of the Green Swamp. It is also home to Brunswick Medical Center.

Education
 Supply Elementary School
 Cedar Grove Middle School

In the media
The novel Holly by Albert French is set in Supply, although the novel indicates that there is a courthouse in Supply, but since Supply is not a county seat it is unclear why the novel so indicates. Supply has a fire department at 17 and 211, station 13

Notable person
Chad McCumbee, an ARCA and NASCAR driver, is a notable resident.

References

Unincorporated communities in Brunswick County, North Carolina
Unincorporated communities in North Carolina
Cape Fear (region)